Cyclone is an unincorporated community in east central McDonald County, in the U.S. state of Missouri. The community is located on Big Sugar Creek west of Powell.

History
A post office called Cyclone was established in 1883, and remained in operation until 1955. The community was named for a cyclone (tornado) which stuck the area in 1880.

References

Unincorporated communities in McDonald County, Missouri
Unincorporated communities in Missouri